6mm XC (also known as 6XC) is a rifle cartridge, similar to the 6x47mm Swiss Match.

History
The 6mm XC was initially developed specifically for NRA High Power match shooting by 11-time NRA High Power National Champion David Tubb. It is touted as being one of the most accurate long-range 6 mm rounds in the world that is designed for repeating rifles.

The 6XC is a CIP standardized case.  Factory brass is available from Norma and Peterson.

Performance

The 6XC is a 1000-yard cartridge, comparable to benchrest calibers such as 6x47mm Swiss Match, 6.5×47mm Lapua and 6 mm/22-250; it fits into cartridge class that exceeds the velocities of benchrest calibers such as 6mm BR Remington, 6mm BRX and 6mm Dasher.  David Tubb has claimed several wins with the 6XC in NRA High Power National Championships and a number of NRA Long Range championship events (1000 yard events).

Muzzle velocity
 7.45 g (115 gr) Hollow Point Boat Tail (HPBT): 3,000 ft/s (910 m/s)

See also
List of firearms
List of handgun cartridges
List of rifle cartridges
List of individual weapons of the U.S. Armed Forces

References

External links 
6XC at 6mmBR.com
6 mm XC at DavidTubb.com
David Tubb on Rifling
6mm XC Brass Measurement Data

Pistol and rifle cartridges
Wildcat cartridges